FC Farul Constanța, now FCV Farul Constanța after the merger with FC Viitorul Constanța, is a Romanian football club which currently plays in Liga I.

Total statistics

Statistics by country

Statistics by competition

UEFA Intertoto Cup 

 1R: First round
 2R: Second round
 3R: Third round
 R16: Round of 16

Romanian football clubs in international competitions
FCV Farul Constanța